Pasquale Padalino (born 26 July 1972) is an Italian football manager and a former central defender, last in charge as head coach of Serie C club Turris.

Playing career

Club 
During his career, Padalino represented U.S. Foggia, Bologna F.C. 1909 (two stints), U.S. Lecce, ACF Fiorentina (where he formed an interesting defensive partnership with Lorenzo Amoruso, later of Rangers F.C.), Inter Milan (having only appeared once, in an Italian Cup contest against Udinese Calcio where he got injured on his right knee, after a contrast with Roberto Muzzi and missed out the rest of the season) and Como Calcio 1907, where he ended his career in 2004.

International 
Padalino's only international cap came in 1996, in a friendly against Bosnia-Herzegovina.

Coaching career 
Having retired in 2004, Padalino started as assistant coach to cousin Gian Piero Ventura at Hellas Verona, leaving at the end of the season to rejoin first team Foggia, as its administrative secretary.

In 2007–08, Padalino rejoined Ventura as second coach, now in Pisa Calcio, also in the second level.

In 2009–10, Padalino started his career as head coach at Nocerina in the Seconda Divisione until the end of the season.

On 7 August 2012 he was named new coach of Foggia in the Serie D. He led the team to promotion to Lega Pro in 2014, then he left the club.

In November 2014 he became the new manager of Grosseto, in the Lega Pro, but he was fired in January 2015, before the end of the season.

On 5 October 2015 he was appointed new coach of Matera and ended the season in 6th place in the Lega Pro.

On 13 June 2016 he was named new coach of Lecce, in the Lega Pro. He was sacked on 24 April 2017, with two games to spare.

He returned into management on 18 December 2018 after being appointed head coach of Foggia, in the Serie B league.

On 13 August 2020 he was hired by Juve Stabia, freshly relegated into Serie C. He left the club at the end of the 2020–21 season.

On 29 December 2021, Padalino was appointed new head coach of Serie C club Siena. On 12 May 2022, Siena announced Padalino's departure from the club.

On 30 August 2022, he was signed by Turris, another Serie C club. On 25 October 2022, less than months since his appointment, Padalino tended his resignations and left Turris.

Managerial statistics

Honours

Club
Fiorentina
Italian Cup: 1995–96, runner-up 1998–99
Italian Supercup: 1996

External links
Inter archive stats 
Pasquale Padalino at Soccerway

References

1972 births
Living people
Sportspeople from Foggia
Italian footballers
Serie A players
Serie B players
Serie C players
Calcio Foggia 1920 players
Bologna F.C. 1909 players
U.S. Lecce players
ACF Fiorentina players
Inter Milan players
Como 1907 players
Italy international footballers
Association football central defenders
Italian football managers
Serie B managers
Serie C managers
Calcio Foggia 1920 managers
S.S. Juve Stabia managers
A.C.N. Siena 1904 managers
Footballers from Apulia